Maple City is an unincorporated community and census-designated place in Leelanau County in the U.S. state of Michigan. The population of Maple City was 209 at the 2020 census.

As an unincorporated community, Maple City holds no legal autonomy of its own, and relies on governance from Kasson Township. However, a post office operates out of Maple City, with the ZIP code 49664.

History
Maple City had its beginnings in 1866 when William Parks and J. T. Sturtevant built a shoe peg factory on land containing several hundred acres of maple timber, and the community that grew up around it was at first known as "Peg Town." When applying for a post office, the name "Maple" was chosen, and when the post office was established on March 9, 1875, the name was given as "Maple City." William H. Crowell, who had purchased the shoe peg factory in that year, was the first postmaster. The factory burned down in 1880, and in 1882, Crowell built a sawmill that operated until 1916.

Demographics 
White (Non-Hispanic) (82.6%), White (Hispanic) (11.6%), Asian (Hispanic) (4.65%), American Indian & Alaska Native (Non-Hispanic) (1.16%), and Black or African American (Non-Hispanic) (0%) make up Maple City, Michigan's 5 largest ethnic groupings.

References

Sources

Further reading
Clarke Historical Library, Central, Michigan University, Bibliography for Leelanau County

Populated places established in 1866
Unincorporated communities in Leelanau County, Michigan
Traverse City micropolitan area
Unincorporated communities in Michigan
1866 establishments in Michigan
Census-designated places in Leelanau County, Michigan
Census-designated places in Michigan